The 1962–63 Intertoto Cup was won by Slovnaft Bratislava after defeating Calcio Padova in the final. A total of 32 clubs contested the tournament, including the first clubs from France, Italy, Hungary and Yugoslavia to participate in the Intertoto Cup.

Teams location

Group winners
The teams were divided into eight groups of four clubs each, although unlike the previous season there was less strict geographical division. The eight group winners (in bold in the tables below) advanced to the knock-out rounds.

Group A1

Group A2

Group A3

Group A4

Group B1

Group B2

Group B3

Group B4

Quarter-finals

Semi-finals

Final
Played over one leg, in Padova.

See also
 1962–63 European Cup
 1962–63 UEFA Cup Winners' Cup
 1962–63 Inter-Cities Fairs Cup

External links
 Intertoto Cup 1962–63 by Karel Stokkermans at RSSSF
  by Pawel Mogielnicki

UEFA Intertoto Cup
4